The Haldia Multi-Modal Terminal is a barge terminal in Port City Haldia in East Midnapore district of West Bengal and a small barrier set for small ships. The terminal is built near the Haldia Port. The terminal will be built as a river port with 61 acres of land. The terminal is built by Inland Waterways Authority of India by help of West Bengal and the Calcutta Port Trust.

Background
Due to the shortage of pontoon transport through the waterway, the government of India has decided to transport the commodity to the waterways as compared to the road and railways. For this, the government announced that the goods will be transported from Haldia to Allahabad by sea. For this, the government began to build uplines for small ships or barges in the Hooghly and Ganges rivers. It is said from the government that the terminals will be constructed in Haldia Sahebganj and Varanasi for shipping the goods through the waterway. To this end, construction of multi-modal terminals in Haldia began.

Transport of product
The proposed Haldia multipurpose terminal in West Bengal will become a major hub for the transportation of goods in West Bengal and north-east India. The terminal has the promise and potential of 5.92 MMPPA  freight traffic by 2018.The main products that will be transported through this terminal include fly ash, banaspati oil, cement etc.

See also 
 National Waterway 1
 Varanasi Multi-Modal Terminal
 Sahebgang Multimodal Terminal

References

External links

Ports and harbours of West Bengal
Ports and harbours of India
River ports of India
Transport in Haldia
Intermodal transport
Proposed ports in India